Robert Samuel Holding (born 20 September 1995) is an English professional footballer who plays as a centre-back for  club Arsenal.

Holding progressed through the Bolton Wanderers youth system, making his senior debut in April 2015 while on loan at Bury. After one season in the Bolton first team, he signed for Premier League club Arsenal in July 2016, for £2 million. He has won the FA Cup and the FA Community Shield twice each with the club. Holding has represented England at under-21 level and was part of the team that won the Toulon Tournament in 2016.

Early life
Holding was born and raised in Stalybridge, Greater Manchester. He attended West Hill School in the town.

Club career

Bolton Wanderers
Holding played for Stalybridge Celtic Juniors before joining the Bolton Wanderers youth system at the age of seven. He joined League Two club Bury on loan on 26 March 2015 for rest of the 2014–15 season. Holding made his only Bury appearance on 3 April 2015 as a 79th-minute substitute in a 2–0 away win against Cambridge United. On his return to Bolton, he signed his professional contract with the club.

He made his Bolton debut on 11 August 2015 as a starter in a 1–0 home defeat to Burton Albion in the League Cup. He scored his first goal for the club on 23 January 2016 in the seventh minute of a 3–1 home win against Milton Keynes Dons. Holding was voted as Bolton Wanderers' Player of the Year for the 2015–16 season. He made 30 appearances, scoring one goal, as the team finished bottom of the Championship and were relegated to League One.

Arsenal

Holding signed for Premier League club Arsenal on 22 July 2016 for a fee of around £2 million. Following injuries to centre backs Per Mertesacker and Gabriel Paulista, he was called upon to make his Arsenal debut in the 2016–17 Premier League season opener on 14 August 2016 against Liverpool, which Arsenal lost 4–3 at home. After his performance in the game against Leicester City, former Arsenal manager, Arsene Wenger, once famously said in the post match press conference, "Unfortunately no one speaks about the performance of Rob Holding. You should be happy, he is English and 20 years old. I am sorry he didn't cost £55 million, so he can't be good." In the final two months of the season, Holding became a regular member of Arsenal's starting line-up, with the team winning all six of the matches he played in the Premier League. He played the full 90 minutes in Arsenal's 2–1 victory over Chelsea on 27 May in the 2017 FA Cup Final at Wembley Stadium.

Holding played in the 2017 FA Community Shield on 6 August which Arsenal won 4–1 penalty shoot-out to Chelsea after a 1–1 extra-time draw. He scored his first Arsenal goal on 28 September 2017 with a close-range shot in their 4–2 away win over BATE Borisov in the UEFA Europa League. He signed a new long-term contract with the club on 1 May 2018.

On 5 December 2018, Holding suffered a ruptured anterior cruciate ligament in his left knee during a 2–2 draw against Manchester United. Holding would undergo surgery and was expected to be out for about six to nine months.

Holding made his return to first team action on 24 September 2019 in Arsenal's 5–0 EFL Cup home victory against Nottingham Forest. He marked his return from injury with his first goal at Emirates Stadium, scoring Arsenal's third from a Reiss Nelson corner-kick. On 1 August 2020, Holding was selected to start in the FA Cup Final against Chelsea, and went on to win his second winners' medal as Arsenal won their 14th FA Cup.

On 28 August 2020, Holding was in the starting 11 in the 2020 FA Community Shield, which Arsenal clinched a 5–4 victory over Liverpool in the penalty shootout after the match was 1–1 after 90 minutes. On 12 January 2021, Holding committed his future to Arsenal by signing a new three and a half year deal. He earned his 100th appearance for the Arsenal in the 3–1 victory over Southampton two weeks later.

On 1 May 2022, Holding scored his first Premier League goal on his 81st appearance in the competition, netting Arsenal's first goal via a Bukayo Saka corner-kick in an eventual 2–1 away victory against West Ham United at the London Stadium. Eleven days later, Holding received his first career red card, picking up a second yellow away against rivals Tottenham Hotspur in the 33rd minute of the North London derby after two bookable offences both on Son Heung-min, with Arsenal going on to lose 3–0.

International career
Holding was called up to the England under-21 squad for the Toulon Tournament May 2016 as a replacement for Everton defender Brendan Galloway. He made his debut for Gareth Southgate's team when starting against Guinea on 23 May. England won the tournament with Holding making two appearances, and was an unused substitute in the final on 29 May as England beat France 2–1. He was selected for England's squad for the 2017 UEFA European Under-21 Championship in Poland, but did not make an appearance with England eliminated in the semi-final. Holding made five appearances for the under-21s from 2016 to 2017.

Career statistics

Club

Honours
Arsenal
FA Cup: 2016–17, 2019–20
FA Community Shield: 2017, 2020

England U21
Toulon Tournament: 2016

Individual
Bolton Wanderers Player of the Year: 2015–16

References

External links

Profile at the Arsenal F.C. website

1995 births
Living people
People from Stalybridge
Footballers from Greater Manchester
English footballers
Association football defenders
Bolton Wanderers F.C. players
Bury F.C. players
Arsenal F.C. players
English Football League players
Premier League players
FA Cup Final players
England under-21 international footballers